Elchin Safarli (born 12 March 1984 in Baku, Azerbaijani SSR, USSR) is an Azerbaijani novelist and journalist. He has published ten novels, written and published in Russian. Composer Asya Sultanova set some of his work to music.

Published works 
Сладкая соль Босфора  (2008)
Туда без обратно  (2008)
Я вернусь  (2009)
Мне тебя обещали  (2010)
Нет воспоминаний без тебя  (2010)
Тысяча и две ночи: Наши на Востоке  (2010)
 (2012)
Если бы ты знал  (If you only knew) (2012)
Когда я без тебя  (2012)
Рецепты счастья  (2013)
Я хочу домой  (2015)
Расскажи мне о море  (2016)
Когда я вернусь, будь дома 2017

References

1984 births
Living people
20th-century Azerbaijani novelists
21st-century Azerbaijani novelists
Azerbaijani male novelists
Azerbaijani romantic fiction writers
Azerbaijani writers
Writers from Baku
20th-century male writers
21st-century male writers